Colobothea sexagglomerata is a species of beetle in the family Cerambycidae. It was described by Dmytro Zajciw in 1962. It is known from Brazil.

References

sexagglomerata
Beetles described in 1962